Layers of Fear is a psychological horror adventure game developed by Bloober Team and published by Aspyr. It was released on Linux, Microsoft Windows, macOS, PlayStation 4, and Xbox One worldwide in February 2016.

In Layers of Fear, the player controls a psychologically disturbed painter who is trying to complete his magnum opus as he navigates a Victorian mansion revealing secrets about his past. The gameplay, presented in first-person perspective, is story-driven and revolves around puzzle-solving and exploration. Layers of Fear: Inheritance was released on 2 August 2016 as a direct follow up add-on to the first game. This time the player controls the painter's daughter with the downloadable content focusing on her apparent relapse into trauma after returning to her old house.

A  definitive port for the Nintendo Switch, entitled Layers of Fear: Legacy, was released on 21 February 2018 and it features, in addition to the Inheritance DLC, Joy-Con, touchscreen, and HD Rumble support. A limited physical retail release for the Nintendo Switch and PlayStation 4, published by Limited Run Games in North America, would be available starting October 2018. A sequel titled Layers of Fear 2 was announced in October 2018 and was released on May 29, 2019. A second sequel, titled Layers of Fears, is set to launch in early 2023.

Gameplay
The player takes control of an artist who has returned to his studio. His initial goal is to complete his masterpiece, and the player's role is to figure out how this task should be accomplished. The challenge comes from puzzles which require the player to search the environment for visual clues. The house appears straightforward at first, but it changes around the player as they explore it in first person. These changes in the environment provide scaffolding for the puzzles and provide regular jump scares common to games of this genre.

The game is divided into six chapters with various items for the player to find in order to complete his work. The game is heavily dimmed, and there are objects that uncover certain aspects of the painter's history. While completing the painting, there is a letter that is slowly pieced together, which shows the origin of his masterpiece, and objects which explain the secret of the painter through dialogue flashbacks.

Plot

Set in the 1920s United States, the unnamed protagonist, a talented artist, returns home from a court hearing. After briefly exploring his empty house, he goes to his workshop to start working on his "magnum opus". After he adds the first layer, he starts having hallucinations about his past encounters as he works, and the full degradation of his mental state becomes increasingly clear as the game progresses and his past is explored.

An ambitious young painter, the artist used his pianist wife as a model and muse. Soon his wife became pregnant and she bore a daughter. After she gave birth, he decided to spend more time working on his paintings, leaving his wife to care for their daughter. After buying a dog for his family, the Protagonist develops a drinking problem due to constant stress and noise outside his workshop. Eventually, he muzzles the dog, but was soon plagued by rats, most likely an auditory hallucination. It is implied the dog may have been killed by him.

The Protagonist's talent starts to slowly decay, with the vision for his paintings becoming twisted, driving his friends away by painting disturbing works for even simple jobs, including a set of illustrations for Little Red Riding Hood. After a long period of neglect, his wife decides to burn his paintings, including his most cherished work, "The Lady In Black". This provokes the artist to beat her in a drunken rage, which in turn causes his wife to leave with their child. Despite multiple attempts to reconcile, his wife rejects him. Later, he receives a phone call explaining that his wife was a victim of a fire, and was horribly scarred, though their daughter survived unharmed.

The artist brings his wife and child home to care for them, but his alcoholic tendencies continue to develop, which he blames on the 'distraction' of his family. Even after regaining her mobility, the wife continues to be neglected by the artist, as her scars had marred her beauty. Another drunken outburst causes his wife to commit suicide in the bathroom, by slitting her wrists. In the present day, it is revealed the artist has fully lost his sanity, and may be using parts of his wife's body in his painting: her skin as the canvas, her blood as the overlay, her bone marrow as the undercoating, a brush made from her hair, her finger for the smearing and her eye as the spectator. The character is shown using these items, but considering the cyclical nature of one of the endings and the general ambiguous nature of what is shown throughout the story, it is possible that this is not meant to be taken literally.

Depending on player actions in the game, three endings are possible. These consist of either avoiding the monstrous figure representing his wife or not, likely symbolizing his rejection or acceptance.

The "Loop" ending (done by avoiding and approaching) reveals that the artist's magnum opus is a portrait of his wife. He completes the painting at last, only to see it devolve into a mutilated version that taunts him. The artist takes the painting and throws it into a room filled with identical portraits, which begin to laugh at him. It becomes clear the artist has spent years attempting to finally complete his painting as intended, even as his mental faculties began to degrade. If the room of paintings is entered, the portraits are revealed to be proper representations of his wife, though he is unable to see this. The artist returns to the studio and begins to work on his next painting on a blank canvas, as the scene fades to black.

In the "Selfish" ending (in which he avoids her completely), the artists painting is a portrait of himself. Finally satisfied, he hangs it in the room upstairs. The next shot shows his painting on display among other famous works in a museum.

In the "Family" ending (where he allows her to approach all times), his completed painting includes his daughter as well as his wife. The artist realizes at last his terrible behavior and mistakes, and that it is impossible to bring them back. He retreats to the room of his paintings and sets them alight, along with his newest work, then lies down to allow the flames to consume him as well.

Inheritance
The Inheritance downloadable content add-on tells the story of the painter's daughter coming back to her childhood home to face her past after she left "The St. Martin de Porres Home for Problem Children". Exploring the destroyed home with a flashlight, she relives her experiences and witnesses the full scope of the tragedy that has swallowed the family.

During the course of these relived memories, there are different outcomes depending on the daughter's actions. These include deliberate choices, such as heading more often towards the mother or father's portrait while exploring, which will lead to remembered dialogue portraying them, respectively, in a more favorable light. Non-deliberate choices involve the daughter having to perform in-game tasks that often affect an interaction with the father. One example involves the daughter creating artwork: the daughter can either create childish drawings with crayons (earning harsh disapproval) or follow the father's suggestions (earning praise if done correctly). These outcomes can lead to the daughter either viewing the father as a harsh man who never wanted anything but a protegee or as a caring man who had trouble showing it.

The "Good" ending occurs if most of the memories lead to viewing the artist favorably. Upon entering her old bedroom, the daughter sees a portrait of her with a flower - her inheritance by her father. She views this portrait as an apology, "expressed in the only language [the artist] ever truly knew". Seeing the father as a tragic figure, who was driven insane and depressed by the memories of the house, she takes the portrait and burns the house down. She leaves accepting the fact that she cannot understand the artist, but can forgive him. The portrait is later shown hanging in the daughter's home, while the daughter admires her own child's drawings. However, the scene ends with the daughter criticizing her child's choice in color - mirroring the same statement the artist made years ago - while the portrait distorts, heavily implying that the daughter is now beginning to experience the same mental health issues and obsession over perfection as her father.

The "Bad" ending occurs if most of the memories lead to viewing the artist negatively. Upon entering her old bedroom, and seeing the portrait of her, the daughter continues having flashbacks of the artist yelling at her for crying and making noise. Still viewing the portrait as an apology, the daughter thinks of the artist's smugness in thinking a painting would resolve her bad childhood. Viewing the portrait as not enough of an apology, in a room filled with bad memories, the daughter smashes it against a dresser. The action inadvertently knocking over a lit candelabra. Fire engulfs the room, leading the ceiling to collapse both trapping and burying the daughter in the burning house.

The "True" ending appears if the daughter collects all of her crayon drawings present throughout the house and is able to rearrange them - with the lights on - to reveal a larger portrait of her. In darkness, a hidden sketch of a large rat reveals a map of the house, showing a marked location the daughter can now find. Realizing her father planted this clue knowing that she would see it, the daughter realizes her true inheritance is seeing the world as her father had. Upon following the map and finding a covered canvas, the daughter remembers being told that "insanity runs in my family", and decides to "let it run". This ending closes on the canvas being unveiled to show the same first layer the artist started with for his story, and the decrepit room appearing bright and intact as it had for the artist.

Development
Layers of Fear was heavily inspired by P.T., a teaser game for the cancelled video game Silent Hills. The plot, in particular the ending with the blank canvas, closely parallels Anthony M. Rud's short story "A Square of Blank Canvas" from the April 1924 issue of Weird Tales. The game uses the Unity game engine.

Reception

Nick Monroe of The Escapist praised the game. "A magnum opus (...) A superb example of making story and atmosphere work together (...) Layers of Fear achieves its goal of making you scared as a player, instead of just existing as something scary". Matt Ferguson from Syfy Games praised the storytelling calling it "Perfection" and saying the game was, "an evocatively thrilling horror game: it strikes a fantastic balance between narrative, gameplay, atmospheric immersion."  Patricia Hernandez of Kotaku said "Layers of Fear is one of the biggest horror surprises of the year." Danielle Riendeau and Dave Tach of Polygon said "Layers of Fear is like P.T. on drugs." Matt Thrower from GameSpot rated the game a 7/10 saying, "Stacked up like the rickety tiers of a Gothic building, Layers of Fear proves aptly named." Leon Hurley praised the game in a GamesRadar review, stating "it's one of the best horror games I've ever played and literally creates a new tool set for interactive scares." He complimented the game's art and the "unease from a horror experience" it provides, giving it a maximum score.

Choi Rad of IGN found the subject of the game interesting but declared the game "not scary", "lacking tension", and that "every time he started to enjoy the flow, it was broken by small puzzle challenges that just aren't fun to solve." Joe Juba of Game Informer echoed Rad's statements critiquing the game's telegraphed scares, noting that it felt like a haunted house at a carnival rather than P.T., declaring that "After a scary moment, it doesn't allow players enough breathing room, because the next one is always immediately around the corner. Every time you enter a room or a hallway, something happens."

Sequels
In October 2018, developer Bloober Team announced a sequel to Layers of Fear, titled Layers of Fear 2, previously code-named Project Méliès. Layers of Fear 2 was published by Gun Media on May 28, 2019. In September 2021, Bloober Team revealed a trailer for a third Layers of Fear project. The game was originally set for release in 2022, but was delayed to 2023.

References

External links

2016 video games
Aspyr games
Fiction about fatherhood
Linux games
MacOS games
Nintendo Switch games
PlayStation 4 games
PlayStation Network games
Psychological horror games
Video games about mental health
Video games developed in Poland
Video games set in the United States
Video games set in the 1920s
Video games set in the 1960s
Windows games
Xbox One games
Works about painting
Bloober Team games
Single-player video games